The list of hurricanes in Canada refers to any tropical cyclone originating in the Atlantic or Pacific Ocean affecting the country of Canada. Canada is usually only hit with weak storms, due to the generally cool waters immediately offshore. However, some hurricanes can strike the area full force as the warm Gulf Stream extends fairly close to Atlantic Canada. Due to the cool waters for a great distance from the Pacific coast of Canada, there has never been a storm of any intensity to directly affect the Pacific coast. On occasion tropical systems can transition into, or be absorbed by, non-tropical systems that strongly affect western Canada, most notably by the remnants of Typhoon Freda that were absorbed by the Columbus Day Storm of 1962.

Despite this however, Ella did not make landfall.

Sometimes, a hurricane will make landfall in the United States and continue northward to dissipate over (or partially over) Canada. Only a handful of storms that have taken this path were devastating in Canada. Two examples of this include the 1900 Galveston hurricane and Hurricane Hazel in 1954.

Many extratropical remnants of tropical cyclones have entered Canada. They are not included in this list unless they were particularly notable. Storms that have entered Canada from the U.S. after landfall are omitted from these lists, exceptions being devastating, or notable cyclones.

This article includes hurricanes that affected Newfoundland prior to its entry into Canada in 1949, and hurricanes that affected any Canadian provinces before confederation in 1867.

List of tropical cyclones
These cyclones have either made a direct landfall in Canada, or made a notable close approach as a tropical cyclone.

Pre-1900
Many tropical storms and hurricanes struck present-day Canada during this time. The most damaging one struck Newfoundland in September 1775, killing thousands. To shorten this particular list, insignificant tropical storms and depressions are omitted.
 September 9, 1775: The 1775 Newfoundland hurricane killed over 4,000 in Newfoundland. Not only is it the earliest recorded Canadian hurricane, it is also by far the deadliest.
 October 10–11, 1804: The 1804 Snow hurricane unusually blanketed parts of Canada with snow after striking New England.
 August 23, 1863: A Category 1 hurricane hit Nova Scotia just before losing tropical characteristics.
 September 23–24, 1866: A hurricane hit Newfoundland after weakening from a Category 2 hurricane.
 October 5, 1869: The 1869 Saxby Gale struck Canada's Bay of Fundy region damaging parts of New Brunswick and Nova Scotia, killing 37 people offshore.
 October 13, 1871: A hurricane hit Nova Scotia.
 August 26, 1873: The Nova Scotia Hurricane of 1873 drifted south of Nova Scotia as a Category 3 hurricane. It weakened to a Category 1 before slowly making landfall in Newfoundland. It was a devastating hurricane that killed over 600. Damage in Nova Scotia was severe. It destroyed over 1,200 boats and over 900 homes and businesses. This is one of Nova Scotia's worst cyclones.
 October 1882: Remnants of a hurricane hit Labrador, resulting in 140 deaths.
 August 26, 1883: A Category 1 hurricane passed offshore Newfoundland, resulting in 80 deaths.
 August 23, 1886: A major hurricane weakened to a Category 1 hurricane before crossing Newfoundland as a hurricane.
 September 8, 1891: A hurricane struck both Nova Scotia and Newfoundland as a Category 1 hurricane.
 August 18, 1893: A hurricane struck Newfoundland with  winds.

1900–1949 
 September 12–14, 1900: After leaving behind a trail of devastation in the United States, the 1900 Galveston hurricane affected six Canadian provinces as a powerful extratropical cyclone, killing 52–232 people, mainly due to shipwrecks.
 August 8, 1926: The 1926 Nova Scotia hurricane made landfall in Nova Scotia as an extratropical storm, killing 55–58 people.
 August 24, 1927: The 1927 Nova Scotia hurricane made landfall in Nova Scotia as a Category 2 hurricane with  winds, causing immense damage, reaching $1.6 million (1927 USD), and killed 172–193 people.
 August 26, 1935: A Category 1 hurricane strikes Newfoundland as an extratropical storm, resulting in major damage and at least 50 offshore deaths.
 September 26, 1937: The extratropical remnant of a hurricane caused damage in Nova Scotia. The storm was moving swiftly, so most of the damage was strictly wind related.
 September 21, 1938: The 1938 New England hurricane tracked into Canada, bringing strong winds to eastern Ontario and southern Quebec. Damage was primarily limited to trees and power lines; structural damage was minimal. This storm, along with Hurricane Hazel in 1954, was one of the few hurricanes to cause hurricane-force winds in Canada's interior.
 October 18, 1939: After a long respite from hurricanes in Newfoundland, a hurricane struck the island as a Category 1 hurricane. No one died, but considerable damage was done to trees, boats, and buildings.
 September 17, 1940: The 1940 Nova Scotia hurricane struck Nova Scotia as a Category 1 hurricane before weakening.

1950–1994 

In this list, tropical storms are included but extratropical remnants are not unless they were notable.
 August 21, 1950: Hurricane Able struck Nova Scotia as a strong tropical storm, causing only minor damage.
 October 5, 1950: Hurricane George passed a few miles south as a tropical/extratropical storm.
 February 5, 1952: The 1952 Groundhog Day tropical storm, affected New Brunswick before dissipating.
 September 7, 1953: Hurricane Carol struck the New Brunswick/Nova Scotia border. It caused about $1 million in damage, mainly to boats and fish craft. 
 October 16, 1954: Hurricane Hazel moved into Ontario as a powerful extratropical storm (still of hurricane intensity) after having struck the Carolinas. Flash flooding from Hazel in Canada destroyed twenty bridges, killed 81 people, and left over 2,000 families homeless. In all, Hazel killed nearly 100 people and caused almost $630 million (2005 CAD) in damages (on top of over 500 other deaths and billions in damage in the US and Caribbean). No other recent natural disaster on Canadian soil has been so deadly. Floods killed 35 people on a single street in Toronto.
In Burlington, 27 boats were destroyed, and one person drowned in Lake Erie after his boat sank. Two other people drowned in the province. Connie destroyed six houses and damaged several others due to high waves.
 September 29, 1958: Hurricane Helene struck Newfoundland as a hurricane. Although not very damaging in Canada, Helene did destroy a  wharf carrying many lobster traps out to sea.
 June 19, 1959: The 1959 Escuminac Hurricane was a devastating hurricane that hit Nova Scotia. 22 boats were lost during the storm. In all the hurricane killed 35. The hurricane was so devastating, a monument was erected on Escuminac Harbour in memory of those lost.
 July 12, 1959: Tropical Storm Cindy struck north of Nova Scotia as an extratropical cyclone.
 October 8, 1962: Hurricane Daisy struck Nova Scotia as a hurricane, near the same area as Frances a year earlier, which struck the area while extratropical.
 October 12, 1962: Typhoon Freda struck British Columbia as a very powerful extratropical cyclone with pressure equivalent to a Major Hurricane.
 October 29, 1963: Hurricane Ginny struck Nova Scotia as a strong Category 2 hurricane, the strongest to ever make landfall in Canada. Ginny was unusual in the fact that the hurricane produced snow.
 October 24, 1964: Hurricane Gladys dissipated near the coast of Newfoundland just after making landfall.
 July 7, 1973: Hurricane Alice side-swiped the entire western coast of Newfoundland as a tropical storm before dissipating over Newfoundland.
 October 25, 1979: A subtropical storm (known as a subtropical "storm" but was actually a subtropical "hurricane" having reached  winds while subtropical) struck Newfoundland as a subtropical storm after losing hurricane strength.
 August 7–8, 1988: Tropical Storm Alberto, the furthest north forming tropical storm ever recorded in the Atlantic, struck the Canadian Maritimes and became extratropical over Newfoundland. Alberto was the first storm with a masculine name to directly strike Canada.
 August 8, 1989: Hurricane Dean passed over Newfoundland before losing tropical characteristics.
 August 2, 1990: Hurricane Bertha's extratropical remnants damaged crops and a suspension bridge in Prince Edward Island.
 November 2, 1991: The 1991 unnamed hurricane, although staying mostly out to sea, made landfall in Nova Scotia as a tropical storm. The storm was not very damaging in Canada, but caused horrendous damage elsewhere.

1995–present 
All landfalling tropical systems are included in the following list. Storms that transited from the U.S. to Canada overland are excluded unless notable. Extratropical storms are also excluded unless notable.
 July 9, 1995: Tropical Storm Barry hit Nova Scotia while tropical with no known damage.
 September 11, 1995: Hurricane Luis, after raging through the Leeward Islands, turned towards Newfoundland on September 8. The Canadian Hurricane Centre issued bulletins on the powerful hurricane as it neared the province. Luis struck a sparsely populated area in eastern Newfoundland on September 11, dropping  of rain in the Avalon Peninsula without causing much damage. One was reported killed in Canada from Luis.
 September 15, 1996: Hurricane Hortense, the first hurricane to directly strike Nova Scotia while at hurricane strength since Blanche in 1975, struck the Nova Scotian coast as a Category 1 hurricane. $3 million were inflicted to Nova Scotia by Hortense after strong winds, heavy rain, and power outages.
 September 18, 1999: Hurricane Floyd struck the Canadian Maritimes after losing tropical characteristics. Despite high interest in Floyd by the CHC, little damage was inflicted in Canada.
 October 20, 2000: Hurricane Michael struck Harbour Breton as a Category 1 hurricane. Overall damage by Michael was light.
 October 15, 2001: Hurricane Karen brought beneficial rain after striking Liverpool, Nova Scotia.
 September 12, 2002: Hurricane Gustav struck Nova Scotia and Newfoundland, both as a Category 1 hurricane. Gustav brought hurricane-force winds to Nova Scotia and dropped at least  of rain across all Nova Scotian sites.
 September 29, 2003: Hurricane Juan is sometimes considered Atlantic Canada's most widely destructive hurricane in over a century. Juan killed 8 and caused over $200 million in damage. Power outages in Nova Scotia and Prince Edward Island left over 300,000 Canadians without power for two weeks. Many marinas were destroyed and many small fish craft were damaged or sank.
 September 17, 2005: Hurricane Ophelia, after stalling for several days off the coast of the southeastern states, raced up the Atlantic coast. On the 17th, Ophelia became extratropical and moved parallel to the Nova Scotian coast, never making landfall. Ophelia later struck Newfoundland. Although strong winds were forecast, they did not occur and overall damage was less than expected. One indirect death was reported from Ophelia in Canada.
 November 3, 2006: the 2006 Central Pacific cyclone, after developing in the north-central Pacific, the system weakened and made landfall on the Olympic Peninsula of Washington State, though it did bring heavy rainfall to Vancouver Island. The exact nature of this storm is debatable, but it appears to have been a tropical or subtropical cyclone for at least a portion of its life. Nonetheless, this cyclone is not included in any archives of the National Hurricane Center, though it was classified as extra-tropical by the Canadian Hurricane Centre.
 November 6–7, 2007: Hurricane Noel, after gaining hurricane-force winds north of the Bahama Islands, Noel moved north toward the Cape Cod region of the Massachusetts U.S. coast. After swiping southeast Massachusetts with hurricane-force winds, the system transitioned to an extratropical stage at which time the storm slightly intensified and moved north-northeast to the Nova Scotia coast near Yarmouth. Full hurricane-force conditions occurred over much of southeastern and eastern areas of Nova Scotia from Yarmouth north and eastward to the metropolitan Halifax area(84 mph recorded at McNabs/Halifax). This very same area reported large-scale power and utility line damage as well as widespread tree damage. In areas south of Halifax the tree damage was more severe than that which had occurred during Hurricane Juan in 2003. This was due to the longer transition over the southern peninsula of Nova Scotia than that of Juan. Though at Category 1 status, Noel in its extratropical stage was responsible for coastal damage to some structures from waves and tides and wind damage to roofing and windows. Western areas of Nova Scotia, even well inland received strong gales, the strongest of which occurred in relation to a tropical system since hurricanes Gerda 1969 and Ginny of 1963.
 September 28, 2008: Hurricane Kyle, after forming as a tropical storm just east of the Bahamas, headed north, making landfall in Nova Scotia as a Category 1 hurricane, causing power outages to 40,000 and $9 million in damage.
 August 23, 2009: Hurricane Bill, a Cape Verde hurricane, brushed by Cape Breton Island, Nova Scotia causing up to 2.3 in of rain. 32,000 residences were reported to have lost power in addition to winds recorded up to 50 mph. Bill then made landfall at Point Rosie, on the Burin Peninsula of Newfoundland.
September 3, 2010: Hurricane Earl made landfall at Western Head, Nova Scotia as a minimal hurricane. Earl produced  sustained winds throughout Nova Scotia, which resulted in widespread power outages, fallen trees, and minor coastal flooding. After crossing Nova Scotia, Earl sped across Prince Edward Island before emerging into the Gulf of Saint Lawrence. As the storm tracked through the Gulf of Saint Lawrence, western and northern Newfoundland experienced sustained tropical storm conditions.
September 21, 2010: Hurricane Igor struck Cape Race, Newfoundland as a large Category 1 hurricane, resulting in major flooding and widespread power outages. Many communities were forced to declare a state of emergency, and some evacuated completely as the storm approached. Igor was unusual in that it restrengthened somewhat during its final approach despite being over cool water. Hurricane Igor produced hurricane conditions throughout the Avalon Peninsula and tropical storm conditions over the remainder of the island. Media outlets have stated that Igor was the worst hurricane to hit Newfoundland in a century. Impacts to Newfoundland were estimated to be US$200 Million
August 28, 2011: Hurricane Irene crossed into Canada as an extratropical storm bringing heavy rain and strong winds to parts of Quebec and New Brunswick. Parts of New Brunswick received over 80mm of rain and wind gusts peaked at 93 km/h in Moncton.
September 16, 2011: Hurricane Maria made landfall near the Avalon Peninsula of Newfoundland. Due to Maria's rapid forward speed (90+ km/h), rainfall totals were kept to a minimum and strong winds remained offshore, confined to the eastern semi-circle. As a result, little damage occurred.
September 26, 2011: Typhoon Roke's remnants brought rain to British Columbia.
October 3, 2011: Hurricane Ophelia made landfall near the Avalon Peninsula of Newfoundland as a strong extratropical cyclone, damaging drainage infrastructure that had been repaired after Hurricane Igor a year earlier.
September 11, 2012: Hurricane Leslie made landfall on the Burin Peninsula of Newfoundland as a hurricane-strength post-tropical cyclone. Leslie's track put the Avalon Peninsula in the right-front quadrant, resulting in hurricane-force winds, widespread power outages, and structural damage.
October 29–30, 2012: Hurricane Sandy crossed into Canada on October 29 through to early October 30, bringing heavy rain, high winds, and in some places, snow, to Ontario, Quebec and the Maritimes.
July 5, 2014: Hurricane Arthur made landfall in south western Nova Scotia on July 5, 2014. The storm at the time was downgraded to a tropical storm. Arthur brought heavy rain, winds and pounding surf to parts of the Atlantic Coast of Nova Scotia. The strong storm dropped nearly 150 mm of rain to parts to New Brunswick. It cut power to 1/3 of the Nova Scotia households and 65% of New Brunswick.
More than 100,000+ Nova Scotia Power customers lost power.
September 7–8, 2019: The post-tropical system that was once Hurricane Dorian made landfall in Nova Scotia and Prince Edward Island with hurricane-force winds and Newfoundland with tropical storm-force winds.

July 11, 2020: Tropical Storm Fay hit Canada as a 40 mph tropical cyclone. It was over Quebec for 3 hours before dissipating. 
August 5-6th, 2020: Hurricane Isaias had its last tropical Update in Canada, causing minimal effects.
September 22–23, 2020: Hurricane Teddy made landfall on Nova Scotia and Newfoundland as a quickly weakening post-tropical storm and did little to no damage to the provinces.
September 10–11, 2021: Hurricane Larry struck South East Bight, Newfoundland as a Category 1 hurricane.
September 10–12, 2022: Hurricane Earl impacted Newfoundland with its outer bands, causing flooding and damages. However, no fatalities were reported in the area. 
September 24–25, 2022: Hurricane Fiona made landfall in Whitehead, Nova Scotia as a Post-tropical cyclone with Category 2 force winds of 170 km/h. Fiona is the strongest storm to ever impact Canada as measured by barometric pressure. Hart Island, NS recorded a pressure reading of 931.6 millibars, which shattered the previous record of 940.2 millibars at St. Anthony, Newfoundland on Jan. 20, 1977. Fiona caused catastrophic damage to electrical infrastructure, which Nova Scotia Power described as 5 times worse than the damage caused by Hurricane Dorian, which in 2019 was considered the most damaging storm in the utilities history. The storm was vast in size and the damaging wind extended well from its center, causing damage across all four Atlantic Provinces and the Magdalen Islands. Storm surge caused homes to be washed out to sea in Channel-Port aux Basques, Newfoundland and severe coastal erosion occurred along the northern coastline of Prince Edward Island. The storm also caused extensive damage to forests across the region, particularly in Eastern Nova Scotia and Cape Breton Island with thousands of trees downed. Insured losses from Fiona in Canada are estimated to be at least $800 million CAD (US$600 million), with the total damage expected to be significantly higher, making Fiona the costliest hurricane in Canadian history and the costliest natural disaster in Atlantic Canada history.

Listed by month

See also

 List of New England hurricanes
 List of Newfoundland hurricanes
 List of Atlantic hurricane records
 Lists of Atlantic hurricanes

References

Canada
 
Hurricanes